Valavoor Kizhakkathil Rajasekharan Pillai or VKR Pillai is an Indian businessman from Kuttamperoor, Mannar in Alappuzha district of Kerala, living in Bahrain. He is the Chairman of Bahrain headquartered national group of companies in Bahrain.  He has been awarded the Pravasi Bharatiya Samman Award 2017, the highest honor conferred on non-resident Indians by the President of India.

Awards and achievements

References

External links
 

Living people
Year of birth missing (living people)
Recipients of Pravasi Bharatiya Samman